This article lists the squads for the 2015 Algarve Cup, the 22nd edition of the Algarve Cup. The cup consisted of a series of friendly games, and was held in the Algarve region of Portugal from 4 to 11 March 2015. The twelve national teams involved in the tournament registered a squad of 23 players.

The age listed for each player is as of 4 March 2015, the first day of the tournament. The numbers of caps and goals listed for each player do not include any matches played after the start of tournament. The club listed is the club for which the player last played a competitive match prior to the tournament. The nationality for each club reflects the national association (not the league) to which the club is affiliated. A flag is included for coaches that are of a different nationality than their own national team.

Group A

Brazil
The squad was announced on 26 February 2015.

Head coach: Vadão

China
Head coach: Hao Wei

Germany
The squad was announced on 23 February 2015.

Sweden
The squad was announced on 18 February 2015.

Head coach: Pia Sundhage

Group B

Iceland
The squad was announced on 23 February 2015.

Head coach: Freyr Alexandersson

Norway
The squad was announced on 16 February 2015.

Head coach: Even Pellerud

Switzerland
The squad was announced on 24 February 2015.

Head coach: Martina Voss-Tecklenburg

United States
A 23-player roster was announced 21 February 2015.

Group C

Denmark
The squad was announced on 12 February 2015.

Head coach: Nils Nielsen

France
The squad was announced on 23 February 2015.

Head coach: Philippe Bergeroo

Japan
The squad was announced on 13 February 2015.

Head coach: Norio Sasaki

Portugal
The squad was announced on 23 February 2015.

Head coach: Francisco Neto

Player representation

By club
Clubs with 5 or more players represented are listed.

By club nationality

By club federation

By representatives of domestic league

References

2015 squads
squad